Helcystogramma rusticella is a moth in the family Gelechiidae. It was described by Francis Walker in 1864. It is found in Amazonas, Brazil.

Adults are cupreous, the forewings with a broad irregular speckled cinereous band and a slightly zigzag transverse line between the band and the base of the wing, as well as a few minute cinereous marks near the costa and continuous to a metallic-purple submarginal band. The hindwings are whitish along the costa.

References

Moths described in 1864
rusticella
Moths of South America